Microsoft Press is the publishing arm of Microsoft, usually releasing books dealing with various current Microsoft technologies. Microsoft Press' first introduced books were The Apple Macintosh Book by Cary Lu and Exploring the IBM PCjr Home Computer by Peter Norton in 1984 at the West Coast Computer Faire. The publisher has gone on to release books by other recognizable authors such as Charles Petzold, Steve McConnell, Mark Russinovich and Jeffrey Richter.

Following a deal signed in 2009, O'Reilly Media became the official distributor of Microsoft Press books. In 2014, the distributor was changed to Pearson. In July 2016, Microsoft Press editorial staff was laid off.

References

External links

Microsoft divisions
Computer book publishing companies
Publishing companies established in 1984